Rodolfo Jorge de Paoli (born 26 October 1978) is an Argentine football manager and former player who played as a midfielder. He is the current manager of Barracas Central along with Alejandro Milano.

De Paoli was also a journalist and a narrator, notably being the main voice for Argentine-based version of the Pro Evolution Soccer series in the 2018, 2019, 2020 and 2021 editions.

Playing career
Born in Buenos Aires, de Paoli began his career with Nueva Chicago, and subsequently represented Banfield before moving to Mexico and Ecuador.

Upon returning to his home country, de Paoli represented El Porvenir before retiring at the age of just 22 in 2000.

Managerial career
In May 2007, de Paoli was named manager of Deportivo Riestra. He was subsequently in charge of Argentino de Merlo and Dock Sud before leaving the latter in 2009 to dedicate himself to becoming a full-time narrator.

On 19 October 2011, de Paoli returned to managerial duties after taking over Liniers. He resigned the following 11 March, after suffering four consecutive defeats.

In April 2015, de Paoli was invited by manager José Oscar Flores to take part of his coaching staff at Defensa y Justicia. On 21 November 2017, he agreed to return to coaching duties after being appointed at Real Pilar, but announced his departure from the club the following 2 June.

On 23 September 2019, after more than a year without coaching, de Paoli was named manager of his first side Nueva Chicago. He resigned the following 3 March, with the club in the last position.

On 26 January 2021, de Paoli was appointed Barracas Central manager. In December, he helped the club to achieve promotion to the Primera División after a 87-year absence.

Personal life
In August 2017, de Paoli was announced as the main narrator of the Argentine-based version of the Pro Evolution Soccer series, starting in the 2018 edition.

References

External links

1978 births
Living people
Footballers from Buenos Aires
Argentine footballers
Association football midfielders
Nueva Chicago footballers
Club Atlético Banfield footballers
El Porvenir footballers
Argentine football managers
Primera B Nacional managers
Nueva Chicago managers
Barracas Central managers